Red Hot + Blue is the first compilation album from the Red Hot Organization in the Red Hot Benefit Series. It features contemporary pop performers reinterpreting several songs of Cole Porter, and the title of the album originates from Cole Porter's musical Red, Hot and Blue.

Released in September 1990, the album sold over a million copies worldwide, raised nearly $1m for the activist group  ACT UP, and was heralded as one of the first major AIDS benefits in the music business. The accompanying ABC television special featured music videos for the songs. The clips portrayed the societal effects of AIDS. 

In 2006 Red Hot + Blue was re-issued as a two-disc set including the original CD remastered, and a DVD of the video collection. And, in 2023,  Bloomsbury Publishing announced that  John S. Garrison would be writing a volume on Red Hot + Blue for its newest round of books in their 33_1/3 book series.

Singles and promotion 
Besides the television special, some of the songs were promoted as singles. Neneh Cherry's reworked version of "I've Got You Under My Skin" was released as the lead single for the album in the UK and Europe and reached  25 on the UK Singles Chart. "Well, Did You Evah!" by Deborah Harry and Iggy Pop received a commercial release in Europe and Australia and reached No. 42 on the UK Singles Chart, No. 18 in Ireland and No. 106 in Australia.

Although no singles were released from the album in the United States, the song "Who Wants to Be a Millionaire?", covered in a techno style by Thompson Twins, received regular airplay on San Francisco's Live 105 (KITS).  This was one of the two songs not to have a video counterpart. U2's cover of "Night and Day" reached No. 2 on the Modern Rock Tracks chart, and presaged the electronic sound the band would explore on Achtung Baby the following year.

Track listing

References

Red Hot Organization albums
Albums produced by Steve Lillywhite
1990 compilation albums
2006 video albums
Music video compilation albums
Pop compilation albums
Rock compilation albums
Rock video albums
Pop video albums
Chrysalis Records compilation albums
Chrysalis Records video albums
Cole Porter tribute albums